Calochilus imperiosus, commonly known as the imperial beard orchid, is a species of orchid endemic to northern Australia. It has a single leaf and up to fifteen dull green flowers with red or purple markings and a labellum with a pinkish red "beard".

Description
The base of the labellum has glossy purple calli and two purple ridges. Flowering occurs from December to February but each flower only lasts two to four days.

Taxonomy and naming
Calochilus imperiosus was first formally described in 2004 by David Jones and the description was published in The Orchadian from specimens collected south of Cooktown. The specific epithet (imperiosus) is a Latin word meaning "possessed of command", "mighty" or "domineering".

Distribution and habitat
The imperial beard orchid grows in grassland and grassy woodland or forest between Cooktown and Herberton in north Queensland and near Kapalga in Kakadu National Park.

References

imperiosus
Orchids of the Northern Territory
Orchids of Queensland
Plants described in 2004